Miss MacIntosh, My Darling is a novel by Marguerite Young.  She has described it as "an exploration of the illusions, hallucinations, errors of judgment in individual lives, the central scene of the novel being an opium addict's paradise."

The novel is one of the longest ever written.

Writing the novel

Young began writing the novel in 1945, expecting it would take two years. She worked on it daily, and did not finish until 1964.  Young has said that had she known it would have taken her so long she would never have started.

Young had been encouraged by Maxwell Perkins, when she submitted a 40-page initial manuscript for the novel, then named Worm in the Wheat.  Over the years, staff at Scribner's had read portions of the work-in-progress.  Nevertheless, the full manuscript was something of a surprise when delivered in February 1964:
  The book was typeset by computer and consumed "38 miles of computer tape".

According to the dust jacket,

In a 1993 interview, Young confirmed the story.  During the interview, Young stated that Miss MacIntosh was  the only invented character in the novel, the rest having all been based on real people. She also said that she had thought that  What Cheer, Iowa was a fictional place.

Character summary
The following brief summaries refer to the "core" descriptions, which are frequently questioned and contradicted.  Some are inconsistent, as in dreams.

Miss Vera Cartwheel the novel's first-person narrator, on a cross-country bus ride, hoping to locate her childhood nursemaid and nanny, Miss MacIntosh.
Miss Georgia MacIntosh frequently called "Miss MacIntosh, my darling" by Vera, she hails from What Cheer, Iowa, and is immune to the elder Cartwheel's dreaming.  One day, about a month after Vera's fourteenth birthday, she was gone, with all personal effects left behind, dead or disappeared.  Completely bald and hairless since birth, she was hit by a bus in Seattle, and had one breast amputated.  She strongly disapproves of electric lights.  Named relatives include her brother Richard, who disappeared while evangelizing Pacific Islanders, her father John Knox, and her mother Mercy.
Mrs. Catherine Helena Cartwheel, née Snowden Vera's mother, the opium lady, living in her New England Boston-area seaside mansion, lost in a permanent opium dream.  Confined to her bed, she is still an eyewitness to everything in her staff's life.  She's not sure if she is alive or dead.
Mr. Joachim Spitzer lawyer who specializes in the affairs of the dead, especially tracing heirs, a composer, now of silent music, he is helplessly sweet on Mrs. Cartwheel, and usually lost in her dreaming.
Peron Spitzer Joachim's identical twin brother, athletic, raffish, gambles on cards and horses, a suicide after he lost the Spitzer inheritance.  Mrs. Cartwheel was sweet on him.  After Peron's death, Joachim was often uncertain whether he was the one who died, or whether he was really Peron.
An old clam-digger Mr. Spitzer's manservant, given to burying himself in the sand.
Moses Hunnecker the bus-driver, drunk, so hateful of Democrats that he never votes lest he pull the wrong lever, and he refuses to cut his hair, since the Democrats haven't taxed hair yet.  Constantly argues with the non-existent Doctor.
Doctor Justice O'Leary non-existent general practitioner, he lost his mind, then his license, who doesn't deliver non-existent babies from non-existent women.  He makes his housecalls, no matter what the weather, despite the fact that his car has no roof, windows, or wheels.  He often argues with his dead sister Sarah.
Sarah O'Leary dead sister of the Doctor, she died at age one, about sixty years ago, but still seeks the Doctor out.
Madge Capehorn née Edwards passenger on the bus, pregnant, riding with her husband, forever jealous of the woman her husband married, and of Jackie, whom she thinks her husband thinks he wanted to marry.  She usually finds the worst interpretation of other people.
Homer Capehorn football player, passenger on the bus, apparently still a virgin.  He usually finds the best interpretation of other people.
Jacqueline "Jackie" White classmate of Homer, costar with him in the school pageant, the most desired girl in school, she went out with no one, and is now dying.
James the Cartwheel chauffeur, but because he likes to shoot things, he left long ago, and was last seen driving a taxicab in Nome, Alaska.
The black coachman the most important Cartwheel family employee of days gone by, supposedly buried next to the sea with his carriage and four white horses, and perhaps a passenger or two, but Mr. Spitzer never answers Mrs. Cartwheel's questions about him.
Cousin Hannah Freemount-Snowden legendary adventurer, mountain climber, desert crosser, who strongly loathes men. A committed suffragette. Deceased.
Jock Cartwheel Catherine's husband, he disappeared while mountain climbing in Europe.  She has no clear memory of him or his name, and is uncertain whether there was a marriage or a funeral.
Lorena a former ward of Miss MacIntosh, her only love.  She grew up to be a fan dancer and strip-tease.
The Tavern's landlord Survivor of the sinkings of the Titanic, the Lusitania, the White Star Castle, and the Prince Edward. 
The Tavern's landlady His wife, a notably poor speller.
Mr. Titus Bonebreaker A former women's shoes' salesman from St. Louis who became a doomsday street preacher in Chicago.  He thought he was rescuing a young and wanton Miss MacIntosh when he became engaged to her, but he fled the night before their wedding when she revealed she was bald and one-breasted, leaving behind his umbrella and watch.
Mr. Weed a part-time hangman, or his shadow.  His first wife Marie hung herself, his current wife Julia has the mind of a child.
Lisa Lunde a young would-be physicist who supports herself by helping Mrs. Cartwheel.
Mrs. Hogden an old, fat, experienced teacher of arithmetic, claims to have been hired by Mrs. Cartwheel, moves in and settles herself in Vera's deserted playroom.  Always an optimist, she steals other people's dreams.
Esther Longtree a fat, perpetually pregnant, waitress at the Greasy Spoon and the mother of numerous stillborns. She fears being tried for "murdering" them. 
Rosemary Esther's stillborn twin sister. Esther had, according to her mother, literally kicked Rosemary out of the womb several months prematurely.  Also according to her mother, Rosemary was destined to be the perfect daughter, smart, beautiful, well-behaved, unlike Esther.
Walter Esther's first mixed race child. The father survived a lynching and fled north. Walter, killed by Esther at birth, now about ten years old, he keeps asking Esther why she killed him, and asks for his father.
The Chicago detective the father, so he thinks, of three children by Esther.
The little toy salesman so little, he feeds out of a baby bottle, he was the lone survivor of a ship sunk during a violent storm.
Joe Goldberg a former featherweight boxing champion, dying, wants to see what he believes is his child by Esther.
The stone deaf man a guest at the Tavern, he can't stop singing about his life and love.  Vera falls in love with his voice.
Lucie Bell the "stone deaf man"'s lover for the night, she either doesn't exist, is mute, or asleep; Vera never finds out.
Solomon the Cartwheel household turtle.
Friday the Cartwheel household dog.

Sources
Minna K. Weissenbach, a rich patron of Edna St. Vincent Millay, also known as the opium lady of Hyde Park, was the inspiration for Catherine Cartwheel.

Harriet Monroe, the founding editor of Poetry, was the inspiration for Hannah Freemount-Snowden.

Howard Mitcham, a deaf Greenwich Village artist and bohemian, was the inspiration for the stone-deaf man.

Influence and reception
As she worked on The Accidental Tourist, Anne Tyler cured spells of writer's block by reading pages from Miss MacIntosh at random. "Whatever page I turned to, it seemed, a glorious wealth of words swooped out at me."  Tyler made Young's novel a traveling companion for her main character Macon Leary.  A hardcover edition of the book was used as a prop in William Hurt's suitcase in the film adaptation.

Anaïs Nin, a friend and neighbor of Young, apparently the novel's first reader, wrote a review for the Los Angeles Times.  This review also appeared in the sixth volume of her diaries after their publication. It served as an introduction to the 1979 Harcourt Brace Jovanovich paperback edition.

A number of writers have given the work high praise.

References

Further reading
Fuchs, Miriam (ed.) Marguerite Young, Our Darling: Tributes and Essays (Dalkey Archive Press, 1994): includes five essays on Miss MacIntosh, My Darling originally published in The Review of Contemporary Fiction 9.3 (Fall 1989).

Turner, Rob. "Marguerite Young's Flood of Consciousness." In Counterfeit Culture: Truth and Authenticity in the American Prose Epic since 1960. Cambridge University Press, 2019, pp. 15-46.
 Wakeman, John (ed.) World Authors 1950-1970, H. W. Wilson, New York (1975).

External links
 Art on Air: Marguerite Young: Miss Macintosh, My Darling 

1965 American novels
Books with cover art by Paul Bacon
Psychological novels
Novels about drugs
Novels about composers
Novels set in Iowa